"Les Deux Amants" is a Breton lai, a type of narrative poem, written by Marie de France sometime in the 12th century. The poem belongs to what is collectively known as The Lais of Marie de France. Like the other lais in the collection, "Les Deux Amants" is written in Old French, in rhyming octosyllabic couplets. This lai tells the tragic story of two lovers.

Plot summary
The story takes place in Normandy, in a great city called Pitre, built by a King. After the death of his wife, The King becomes overly attached to their daughter. Rumours around the court of his inappropriateness provoke him to devise a plan; to offer his daughter for marriage, and yet make the success of any suitor impossible. The man must carry his daughter up a hill, without stopping to rest. Many attempt, and all fail; some men make it halfway up the mountain but none reach the top. 
A son of a count in the realm falls in love with the King's daughter, and she begins to fall for him too. They embark upon a secret affair, but the secrecy upsets the youth, who proposes they elope. The Princess refuses, not wanting to upset her father, but also notes that the boy is not strong enough to pass the King's test. However, she speaks of her aunt in Salerno who is competent in potions, and with her written request, will make the boy a potion to increase his strength. 
The boy returns with the potion and publicly proposes. The King is dismayed at the weakness of the youth, but nonetheless sends out word for his subjects to witness the event. The King's daughter begins to starve in order to be a lighter weight to carry.
The day of the trial comes, and the boy begins his ascent, carrying his love. He carries the potion in his mouth but decides he does not need it for the first half, and relies on adrenaline. He reasons that he would be distracted by the crowd if he slowed down to take the potion. The youth makes it two-thirds of the way and still refuses to take the potion – when he makes it to the top, he drops dead from exhaustion. Unable to revive him, the girl throws the potion away in her upset. She dies of sadness next to her love. When the King finds their bodies, he collapses. After three days, their bodies are buried together on the mountain, and in tribute, the mountain is named ‘The Mountain of the Two Lovers’.

Allusions
The mountain mentioned in the poem actually exists, near the commune of Pîtres in the Normandy region of France.

See also
Anglo-Norman literature
Medieval literature

Notes and references

External links
Text in Old French on wikisource.fr

French poems
Lais of Marie de France

PDF:
http://bibnum.enc.sorbonne.fr/omeka/files/original/796aaaf2efa33ef31f2e5d3a1b4a7ce8.pdf